Gorliczyna-Szewnia  is a village in the administrative district of Gmina Przeworsk, within Przeworsk County, Podkarpackie Voivodeship, in south-eastern Poland.

References

Gorliczyna-Szewnia